Holy man is a person, usually an ascetic, who is exceptionally pious or religious.

Holy man or Holyman may also refer to:


Film
Holy Man, a 1998 film starring Eddie Murphy
 The Holy Man, a 2005 Thai comedy film
Mahapurush, or The Holy Man, a 1968 film by Satyajit Ray

Music
Holy Man (album), a 2000 album by Joe Lynn Turner

Songs
"Holy Man", a 1968 song released as a single by Scott McKenzie
"Holy Man", a song by Deep Purple from their 1974 album Stormbringer
"Holy Man", an instrumental song by Dennis Wilson, recorded during the Pacific Ocean Blue sessions
"Holy Man", a song by Paul Weller on the 1993 album Wild Wood
"Holy Man", a song by One Minute Silence from their 2000 album Buy Now... Saved Later
"Holyman", a song by Blind Melon on the 1992 album Blind Melon

Other uses
Holyman, an Australian company that operated cargo ships and ferries in Australia and other countries
Holyman House, an iconic Art Deco building in the central business district of Launceston, Tasmania, Australia

See also
Holman (surname), which can mean "holy man"